Mohammad Jewel Rana (born 25 December 1995) is a Bangladeshi footballer who plays as a right winger for Bangladesh Premier League club Abahani Limited Dhaka.

Club career

Brothers Union
Rana started his professional career in 2013 when he signed a contract with Brothers Union. He came into the limelight in the 2013 Super Cup when he scored three goals and became joint top scorer with Sheikh Russel KC's Jahid Hasan Ameli and Dhaka Mohammedan's Wahed Ahmed. He received The Rising Star award there.

Dhaka Mohammedan
At the end of the 2013–14 season, he earned a contract from Dhaka Mohammedan for the next season.
2014–15 season was also very successful for Rana. He scored seven goals for Black and Whites and became the second top scorer in the local merit list of the 2014–15 Bangladesh Premier League.

Sheikh Jamal Dhanmondi Club
Rana made his AFC Cup (continental club tournament) debut as a loaned player for Sheikh Jamal Dhanmondi Club against Tampines Rovers on 26 April 2016. He played an important role for the team where his team won the match by 3–2 goals. He also received the Player of the Match award in that match.

Abahani Limited Dhaka

On 19 June 2019, Rana scored his first goal in AFC Cup against Manang Marshyangdi Club.

International career
For brilliant performance in local football Rana was called for the national team very soon by Lodewijk de Kruif in 2015.
He made his debut at an International friendly against Singapore on 30 May 2015. He received the Player of the Match award for his performance against Tajikistan during the 2018 FIFA World Cup qualification. He also played well against Asian Giant Jordan in the same qualification round. He missed two easy chances due to his inexperience. He scored his first international goal against Sri Lanka at the 4 Nations Cup.

International Goals
Dhaka Abahani

Bangladesh

Career statistics

International

References

Living people
1995 births
Bangladeshi footballers
Bangladesh international footballers
Association football midfielders
Footballers at the 2014 Asian Games
Asian Games competitors for Bangladesh
Abahani Limited (Dhaka) players
Bangladesh Football Premier League players